Noah Garret "Bo" Naylor (born February 21, 2000) is a Canadian professional baseball catcher for the Cleveland Guardians of Major League Baseball (MLB). He made his MLB debut in 2022.

Amateur career
Naylor attended St. Joan of Arc Catholic Secondary School in Mississauga, Ontario, and played for the Canadian junior national baseball team. He appeared in the Under Armour All-America Game and the Under-18 Baseball World Cup held in Ontario in 2017. He committed to attend Texas A&M University to play college baseball.

Professional career
The Cleveland Indians selected Naylor in the first round, with the 29th pick, in the 2018 Major League Baseball draft. He signed with Cleveland, rather than enroll at Texas A&M, for a $2,578,138 signing bonus. He was assigned to the Arizona League Indians and spent the whole season there, batting .274 with two home runs and 17 RBIs in 33 games.

Naylor spent the 2019 season with the Lake County Captains. Over 107 games, he batted .243 with 11 home runs and 65 RBIs. In 2021, he played with the Akron RubberDucks, slashing .188/.280/.332 with ten home runs and 44 RBIs over 87 games. In June, Naylor was selected to play in the All-Star Futures Game. In 2022, with Akron, Naylor had a .271 average, .898 OPS and six home runs. Naylor was promoted to the Columbus Clippers in June.

The Guardians selected Naylor's contract on October 1, 2022, adding him to their active roster. He made his major league debut the same day against the Kansas City Royals as a defensive replacement.

Personal life
Naylor's older brother, Josh Naylor, is a professional baseball player who also plays for Cleveland. His younger brother, Myles, also plays baseball.

References

External links

2000 births
Living people
Akron RubberDucks players
Arizona League Indians players
Baseball people from Ontario
Black Canadian baseball players
Canadian expatriate baseball players in the United States
Cleveland Guardians players
Columbus Clippers players
Lake County Captains players
Major League Baseball catchers
Major League Baseball players from Canada
Sportspeople from Mississauga
2023 World Baseball Classic players